The Women I've Become is the ninth album by Swedish pop and country singer Jill Johnson, released on 25 October 2006. The album was recorded in Nashville and was produced by Nathan Chapman and his musicians. It peaked at number two on the Swedish albums chart and was certified gold.

Track listing
"Till the Cowboys Come Home"
"When Love Doesn't Love You"
"Blessed Are the Brokenhearted"
"Baby Don't Go"
"Same Everything"
"Cowboy Up"
"I'm Sorry"
"Something I Can't Do"
"Love Ain't Nothin'"
"Too Late to Be Drinkin'"
"Everybody Smile"
"Red Corvette"
"The Woman I've Become"

Charts

Certifications

References

2006 albums
Jill Johnson albums
Albums produced by Nathan Chapman (record producer)